Pascal "Pommes" Hens (born 26 March 1980 in Daun, Rhineland-Palatinate) is a former German team handball player and former World Champion. He received a silver medal at the 2004 Summer Olympics in Athens with the German national team. He is World Champion from 2007, and European champion from 2004.
The last team he played for was HBW Balingen-Weilstetten. He won the EHF Cup Winner's Cup in 2007 and the EHF Champions League in 2013 with HSV Hamburg. He represented his native country at the 2008 Summer Olympics in Beijing, China.

References

External links
"Pascal Hens", n°16 on Time’s list of "100 Olympic Athletes To Watch"
 official Website

1980 births
Living people
People from Daun, Germany
Sportspeople from Rhineland-Palatinate
German male handball players
Olympic handball players of Germany
Handball players at the 2004 Summer Olympics
Handball players at the 2008 Summer Olympics
Olympic silver medalists for Germany
Sportspeople from Hamburg
Olympic medalists in handball
Medalists at the 2004 Summer Olympics
Expatriate handball players
German expatriate sportspeople in Denmark